Chaetopsis quadrifasciata is a species of ulidiid or picture-winged fly in the family Ulidiidae.

References

quadrifasciata
Insects described in 1928